Sebastián Moreno (born 6 February 1992) is a Salvadoran tennis player.

Moreno has a career-high ITF juniors ranking of 393, achieved on 26 July 2010.

Moreno represented El Salvador at the 2010 Davis Cup, where he has a W/L record of 0–2.

Davis Cup

Participations: (0–2)

   indicates the outcome of the Davis Cup match followed by the score, date, place of event, the zonal classification and its phase, and the court surface.

References

External links

1992 births
Living people
Salvadoran male tennis players